The 1920 Arizona Wildcats football team represented the University of Arizona as an independent during the 1920 college football season. In their sixth season under head coach Pop McKale, the Wildcats compiled a 6–1 record and outscored their opponents, 381 to 65. The team captain was Alter Louis Slonaker.

Schedule

References

Arizona
Arizona Wildcats football seasons
Arizona Wildcats football